Usapang Business was a Philippine business television show created by ABS-CBN News and Current Affairs and aired on ABS-CBN and ABS-CBN News Channel from May 9, 1996 to October 26, 2002. The show was hosted by Ces Drilon, Cathy Yang and David Celdran.

The format of the weekly news magazine program that aired Tuesday nights after The World Tonight, Pulso: Aksyon Balita and ABS-CBN Headlines (later Saturday) features innovative businesses that are on the fast-track in the Philippines.

Hosts
Ces Drilon (1996–2002)
Cathy Yang (1996–1999)
 David Celdran (1997–2001)

See also
List of programs broadcast by ABS-CBN

References

1996 Philippine television series debuts
2002 Philippine television series endings
1990s Philippine television series
Philippine television shows
ABS-CBN original programming
ABS-CBN News Channel original programming
ABS-CBN News and Current Affairs shows
Filipino-language television shows
English-language television shows